Miguel Ángel Heredia (born August 21, 1966 in Mollina, Spain) is a Spanish politician and senator. He is a Deputy in the Congress of Deputies of Spain representing Malaga in the 6th, 7th, 8th, 9th, 10th, 11th and 12th legislatures of Spain respectively.

References 

Living people
1966 births
People from Málaga
Members of the 11th Congress of Deputies (Spain)
Members of the 12th Congress of Deputies (Spain)
Members of the 10th Congress of Deputies (Spain)
Members of the 9th Congress of Deputies (Spain)
Members of the 8th Congress of Deputies (Spain)
Members of the 7th Congress of Deputies (Spain)